Costin Ion Murgescu (October 27, 1919 – August 30, 1989) was a Romanian economist, jurist, journalist and diplomat. A supporter of fascism during his youth, he switched to communism by the end of World War II, and became an editor of the Communist Party daily organ, România Liberă. He taught at the University of Bucharest and worked for the Economic Research Institute. Having campaigned for multilateralism in world affairs as early as 1944, he helped to distance Romania from the Soviet Union after 1964, and later represented his country at the United Nations. He wrote extensively, publishing works on the effects of land reform and industrialization, on the history of economic thought, and on Romania's relations with the Comecon and the First World.

An innovator among the Romanian communist intellectual and professional elite, Murgescu spent his final decades questioning the assumptions of Marxian economics. At the Institute for World Economy, which later became a branch of the Romanian Academy, he trained a new generation of like-minded economists. Shortly before his death, he was involved in dissidence against the Nicolae Ceaușescu regime. Although he did not live long enough to witness the 1989 Revolution, he played an indirect part in shaping the economic policies to which the country turned in post-communism.

The estranged son of Lieutenant Colonel Murgescu, a convicted war criminal, Costin Murgescu was married to Ecaterina Oproiu, a Romanian writer and social commentator. He was survived by his nephew and disciple, historian Bogdan Murgescu.

Biography

Early life and fascist militancy
Born in Râmnicu Sărat, the future economist was the son of a Romanian Land Forces officer, Ion C. Murgescu. Young Murgescu was originally interested in jurisprudence, and entered the law faculty of the University of Bucharest. His beginnings were as a literary critic, with an essay on the literary and artistic life of Balcic. It was picked up by the magazine Familia, and deemed "interesting, but insufficient" by chroniclers at Revista Fundațiilor Regale. Aged nineteen, Murgescu wrote a historical work, about the trial of the Transylvanian Memorandum signatories. Around that time, he was also a staff writer for the Oradea literary newspaper, Noua Gazetă de Vest, where he conducted a questionnaire survey on the state of cultural life in the provinces of Greater Romania.

During the first years of World War II, Murgescu was a supporter of the fascist Iron Guard and, in his own definition, a theoretician of "totalitarian" politics. He began a collaboration with the newspaper Universul, where, as later recounted by his colleague Ștefan Baciu, he was one of the three staff writers who showed up for work wearing the Guard's green-colored shirts. Starting in August 1940, a full month before the Guard proclaimed its National Legionary regime, Murgescu published a series of political musings in Universul. These were soon after collected as a brochure, Note pentru Statul Totalitar ("Notes on the Totalitarian State"). The newspaper's literary chronicler, Constantin Fântâneru, presented Murgescu as "that model of an author who will win people over to a doctrine simply by outlining clearly its ideas." The brochure quoted at length from the speeches of Benito Mussolini and Iron Guard leader Horia Sima. Envisaging the birth of a "new man", "strong, lively, and immaculate", it called for a non-violent "moral revolution" to bring Romania into the "New European Order". It sought to rebuild culture around the Guard's "Legionary spirit", and promised artistic freedom "only to ethnic Romanians."

In his Universul chronicles, Murgescu offered his praise to the Conducător, Ion Antonescu, as well as to the Guard's founding father, Corneliu Zelea Codreanu. Moreover, he penned warnings against the Guard's enemies: "those who have martyred this People—no mercy for them. They should expect a terrible punishment." He still had contributions as a literary critic, such as a short introduction to Japanese poetry.

Murgescu remained active in the press after the Guard fell from power in the violent purge of early 1941. With Antonescu as the uncontested dictator, Romania became involved in the anti-Soviet war as an ally of Nazi Germany. Murgescu was drafted into the Romanian Land Forces, but continued to write (including an unpublished novel and war diary) and was allowed to pass his examinations at the university. With his journalistic work, he moved to the more mainstream review, Vremea, where he contributed analytical essays about the war effort. In one such piece, on October 25, 1942, just before the crushing of Romanian forces, he predicted that the Red Army was too exhausted and famished to mount an offensive. By 1943, his articles in Vremea and Revista Fundațiilor Regale were turning toward economics and economic history, citing Victor Slăvescu as a model and inspiration.

Murgescu's father, Ion, had "strong pro-Nazi sympathies" and was a willing participant in Antonescu's war crimes. By September 1942, the elder Murgescu was the commandant of Vapniarka, a concentration camp for Jewish deportees, ordering them to be fed on grass pea, which caused an outbreak of lathyrism and resulted in several deaths and many more crippling infirmities.

Communist turn and România Liberă
As noted by historian Lucian Boia, Costin Murgescu had renounced his "juvenile totalitarian illusions" by January 1944, with Romania facing the possibility of a Soviet invasion. Contacting the anti-fascist circles, and finding himself in open conflict with his own father, Murgescu became a contributor to Ecoul, the semi-legal newspaper. It published his essays against Antonescu's economic policies and the New Order, which argued, with a noted "dialectical" tinge, in favor of multilateralism and an "international division of labor". His Vremea articles, arranged for print by the antifascist editor George Ivașcu, looked forward to a new era of peace, shaped by international cooperation. According to Boia, he may have been encouraged to explore the subject by the Propaganda Ministry, which was sending out signals that some dignitaries were willing to sue for peace.
 
During or immediately after the August 23 Coup which toppled Antonescu, Murgescu involved himself with left-wing political circles, including the Romanian Communist Party (PCR). Following the country's change of orientation, Lt-Col. Murgescu was arrested. He was initially sentenced to death, and some authors believe that he was executed. However, his sentence was commuted to life imprisonment with hard labor on June 1, 1945. Passing through the notorious Aiud prison, he may have still been alive during the mid 1950s. As a display of his loyalty to the new regime, Costin volunteered for war against the Nazis, fought in Northern Transylvania, and was badly wounded.

From 1944 to 1952, that is to say during the early stages of the Romanian communist regime, Murgescu was editor of the PCR's România Liberă newspaper. In this capacity, he helped organize its bureau of national and international correspondents, as well as its agitprop section. He contributed various articles on national affairs and international relations, praising the 1945 visit to Moscow of the PCR Minister of Transport Gheorghe Gheorghiu-Dej as "a momentous start" in Soviet–Romanian relations. He was also a prominent contributor to the communist literary magazine, Contemporanul, where he praised the party for its "consolidation of democracy".

Around 1950, Murgescu married Ecaterina Oproiu, a fellow România Liberă journalist who went on to establish the official film magazine, Cinema. She later achieved fame in her own right, as Romania's first-ever television critic and a promoter of socialist feminism.

Economic Research Institute
Expelled from România Liberă following an inquiry into his social origins, Murgescu focused entirely on his work in economics. From 1953 to 1956, he was a scientific researcher in the political economy department of the University of Bucharest. He later joined the team of economists and statisticians at the Bucharest Economic Research Institute (ICE), which was headed by Gogu Rădulescu, a disgraced and sidelined PCR activist. Rădulescu appointed him head of the National Economy Section, and deputy ICE Director. Murgescu was assigned to work on an economic overview of the 1945 land reform, which he published in 1956 at Editura Academiei. Writing at the time, Marxist philosopher Ernő Gáll suggested that Murgescu's tract offered "rich and convincing material" about the pauperization of Romania's peasant class before and during World War II. As noted in 2009 by scholars Dorin Dobrincu and Constantin Iordachi, the study, written "during the Stalinist years", has "limited analytical value", but still stands out as the only land reform monograph in "domestic historical writing" under communism.

By the end of the 1950s, with a slight relaxation of communist censorship, Murgescu tried to promote a reevaluation of interwar Romanian sociology, and organized at the ICE work-groups that were basing themselves on Dimitrie Gusti's sociological research teams. These rural expeditions, recounted by Murgescu's articles in Contemporanul (August 1957), allowed for a discussion of collectivization, which they presented as a relevant success (particularly so in the model regions of Constanța and Hunedoara). Also in Contemporanul, Murgescu published an essay that sought to rehabilitate Gusti, but his effort was smothered by the Communist Party in 1959. Nevertheless, according to fellow economist Egon Balas, Murgescu was also able to use political censorship for his own gains, "manufacturing a conflict" with Miron Constantinescu, the ICE researcher and dissident communist, and obtaining his ousting. As a result of this intrigue, Murgescu became sole editor of the ICE academic journal, Revista Economică, in 1958.

Making occasional returns to the field of Marxist economic history, Murgescu wrote propaganda works, accusing the deposed Romanian royal family, and in particular Carol II, of having organized a "plunder" of Romanian assets. In 1960, the anticommunist Romanian diaspora stood accused by the communists of covering up for fascism. In reply, the Paris-based magazine La Nation Roumaine published ample revelations about the fascist past of Murgescu, Mihai Ralea, Mihu Dragomir, and various other figures of the new regime.

Also in 1960, Murgescu and N. N. Constantinescu were editors of a major economic history tract, Contribuții la istoria capitalului străin în Romînia ("Contributions to the History of Foreign Capital in Romania"). This work, also put out by Editura Academiei, was revisited some 20 years later by historian Vasile Bogza, who noted that, despite some flawed interpretations, it remained one of the "thorough studies" in the field. A University of Bucharest professor, Murgescu was received as a corresponding member of the Romanian Academy in 1963, earning a doctorate in economics from the Bucharest Academy of Economic Studies in 1964. He also served the Institute of South-East European Studies as an academic supervisor for its Revue des Études Sud-est Européenes.

National communism
By 1963, Murgescu was called upon by the regime to inform the world about Romania's economic ideology, which was increasingly different from Soviet policies. That year, he denounced the Comecon's "pseudo-theories" on industrialization, which seemed to offer Romania a subservient economic position within the common market. In 1964, the PCR leadership called upon Murgescu to publish an even more virulent official reply against the Soviets and the Comecon. By advancing a "Valev Plan", the Soviets had suggested that Romania become an agricultural hinterland for the more industrialized socialist countries. Murgescu's critiques of this proposal announced a new political stage, of national communism. His articles called for a reform of the Comecon, and, defying the Sino-Soviet split, suggested the accession of China.

With the inauguration of Nicolae Ceaușescu as Party Secretary, and later President of Romania, Murgescu had more opportunities to expand on his economic theories. Serving as ICE director from 1965 to 1968, Murgescu continued to edit Revista Economică to 1968, then Revista Română de Relații Internaționale (from 1968 to 1970). From June 1969, he had a Tuesday evening show on Radio Romania, as part of the series Tableta de Seară, which also featured, among others, actor Radu Beligan, mathematician Grigore Moisil, writer Marin Sorescu, and literary scholar Edgar Papu. He moved from ICE to the Institute for World Economy (IEM), where he worked from 1970 until his death, and was for a while its director. In 1976, he was elected Vice President of the International Marketing Federation.

The Romanian position regarding the Comecon was given expression in a 1969 tract România socialistă și cooperarea internațională ("Socialist Romania and International Cooperation"), which came out at Editura Politică with Murgescu, Mircea Malița and Gheorghe Surpat as the three authors. In 1974, he published, at Editura Meridiane, the French-language introduction L'economie socialiste en Roumanie ("Romania's Socialist Economy"). It explained the regime's policy of cooperating with the West in industrial development and scientific research, noting that socialist economies had to catch up with capitalism before the latter could experience a final crisis. According to Canadian economist Jeanne Kirk Laux, Murgescu was trying to reconcile Romania's relations with multinational corporations with Ceaușescu's "national sovereignty obsession". Indirectly, the book documents the regime's efforts to compensate for the high price of Western technology by proposing various methods of counter trade (methods which, Kirk Laux notes, Murgescu claimed as original Romanian contributions to the theory of international trade).

Murgescu was particularly interested in Romanian economic history in relation to the global economy, and a pioneer of interdisciplinarity. In 1967, he returned to sociology by contributing to a collective study on "the effects of industrialization on social mobility". With Damian Hurezeanu, Murgescu was a guest of the 15th International Congress of Historical Sciences (Bucharest, 1980), where they presented a new synthesis of land reform policies in interwar Romania. He followed up with several studies, including his signature work, Mersul ideilor economice la români ("The Development of Economic Ideas among the Romanians", 1987 (vol. I), 1990 (vol. II)).

Dissidence, death, and legacy
A Romanian Ambassador to the United Nations in the early 1980s, Murgescu also served for a while as ECOSOC President. He published his notes on the New International Economic Order in Partners in East-West Economic Relations, a collection of studies edited by Zoltán Fallenbüchl and C. H. McMillan for Pergamon Press. They outlined Romania's support for the New International Economic Order and her critique of the Soviet Union. As Murgescu argued, the Soviet economy was to be taxed the same as a capitalist developed country when contributing to the United Nations Development Programme.

Murgescu spent the last stage of his life as a dissident, in latent conflict with Ceaușescu. At the IEM, he helped organize debates about politics and economics, introduced Romanian students to the core notions of supply-side economics, and made hints about the need for profound change. Reportedly, Murgescu's 1982 work on the Japanese economic miracle was a Romanian best-seller. Allegedly, Murgescu had come to believe that the Valev Plan was a consistent form of economic integration, and that national communism was essentially flawed.

Foreign Minister Ștefan Andrei shielded Murgescu from Ceaușescu's anger, and allowed him to maintain a link with the West through contacts with Reuters. Another inner-PCR dissident and former diplomat, Silviu Brucan, indicated Murgescu as one of his main sources for critical reports which were sent to foreign ambassadors in Romania. Murgescu died a few months before the anti-communist Revolution.

Mersul ideilor, reissued by the National Bank of Romania presses in 1994, was complemented by the posthumous Drumurile unității românești ("The Paths of Romanian Unity", 1996). As a learning institution, the IEM was the alma mater of economists who rose to political prominence after 1989, among them Eugen Dijmărescu, Mugur Isărescu, Napoleon Pop, and Victor Babiuc. In 1990, it was renamed the "Costin Murgescu Institute of World Economy", becoming part of the Romanian Academy network. According to Isărescu: "At the Institute for World Economy, professor Costin Murgescu was able to fulfill his calling on many levels. Constantly preoccupied with establishing a Romanian school of economic research, he turned [the IEM] into a veritable creative workshop." As noted in 2010 by sociologist Zoltán Rostás, Murgescu's "sinuous youth" was "hardly mentioned", "but [he] was nearly sanctified by the elite of economists who are now in their sixties."

Murgescu was survived by his wife, Ecaterina Oproiu, who went on to serve as a Presidential appointee on a visual media regulatory agency, the National Audiovisual Council, between 1992 and 2000. Murgescu's nephew, Bogdan Murgescu, also trained in economic history, and achieved notoriety for his analysis of economic backwardness. He credits Costin Murgescu as an early influence on his own work.

Notes

References
Egon Balas, Will to Freedom: A Perilous Journey through Fascism and Communism, Syracuse University Press, Syracuse, 2000, 
Lucian Boia, Capcanele istoriei. Elita intelectuală românească între 1930 și 1950. Humanitas, Bucharest, 2012, 
Zbigniew Brzezinski, The Soviet Bloc, Unity and Conflict, Harvard University Press, Cambridge, 1967, 
Mugur Isărescu, Reflecții economice. Piețe, bani, bănci, Centrul Român de Economie Comparată și Consens, Bucharest, 2006, 
Jeanne Kirk Laux, "La Roumanie et les multinationales", in Revue d'Études Comparatives Est-Ouest, Vol. 12, Issue 4, 1981, pp. 61–89 
Geza Kornis, "Fragmente din Memorii (Din viaṭa mea și vremurile mele)", in Smaranda Vultur, Adrian Onică (eds.), Memoria salvată II, West University of Timișoara, 2009, pp. 213–238

1919 births
1989 deaths
20th-century Romanian economists
20th-century essayists
20th-century Romanian novelists
20th-century Romanian historians
Romanian jurists
Romanian sociologists
Romanian newspaper editors
Romanian magazine editors
Academic journal editors
Romanian essayists
Romanian diarists
Male essayists
Romanian male novelists
Romanian literary critics
Romanian writers in French
People from Râmnicu Sărat
University of Bucharest alumni
Bucharest Academy of Economic Studies alumni
Academic staff of the University of Bucharest
Corresponding members of the Romanian Academy
Members of the Iron Guard
20th-century Romanian politicians
Romanian communists
Marxist journalists
Romanian propagandists
Romanian radio presenters
Romanian Marxist historians
Romanian Land Forces personnel
Romanian military personnel of World War II
Permanent Representatives of Romania to the United Nations
Romanian dissidents
20th-century diarists